The 2013 World Women's Handball Championship, the 21st event hosted by the International Handball Federation (IHF), was held in Serbia from 6 to 22 December 2013.

Brazil defeated Serbia 22–20 in the final and became the first IHF world champions from the Americas.

Venues
Five venues in four cities had been selected to host the matches:

Bidding process
South Korea was the other applicant for the championship. The decision to select Serbia as the host was announced on 2 October 2010.

Qualified teams

1 Bold indicates champion for that year, Italics indicates host for that year.

Squads

Group draw
The draw was held on 15 June 2013 at 11:30 local time.

Seeding

TH = Title holder

Group stage
All times are local (UTC+1).

Twenty-four participating teams were placed in the following four groups. After playing a round-robin, the top four teams in each group advanced to the Knockout stage. The last two teams in each group played placement matches.

Tie-breaking criteria
If two or more teams have finished tied on an equal number of points, the finishing positions were set to be determined by the following tie-breaking criteria in the following order
 number of points obtained in the matches among the teams in question
 goal difference in the matches among the teams in question
 number of goals scored in the matches among the teams in question (if more than two teams finish equal on points)
 goal difference in all the group matches
 number of goals scored in all the group matches
 drawing of lots

Group A

Group B

Group C

Group D

President's Cup (place 17-24)

17–20th place playoff

17–20th place semifinals

19th place game

17th place game

21st–24th place playoff

21st–24th place semifinals

23rd place game

21st place game

Knockout stage (place 1-16)

Bracket

Round of 16

Quarterfinals

Semifinals

Third place game

Final
The final was played at the Kombank Arena between Brazil and the host Serbia and was attended by 19,467 spectators. Referees of the match were Spain's Andreu Marín and Ignacio García. It was the first final ever for both teams with Brazil's previous best result being fifth place at the 2011 World Championship and third place for Serbia at the 2001 World Championship (then as FR Yugoslavia). Both teams advanced to the final after playing in Group B of the group stage with Brazil winning their match in the third round 25–23. On the way to the final in the knockout stage Brazil defeated the Netherlands, Hungary and Denmark, while Serbia won its matches against South Korea, Norway and Poland.

The game started with an early 3–1 lead for the Brazilians, but Serbia came from behind to level the result and took control of the match with an 8–6 lead. Serbian players had the last lead in the match at 10–9 before Brazil went on with a 4–0 run to take a three-goals lead 13–10. The Serbian team scored before halftime to make it 13–11 at the break. In the second half, Brazil started furiously scoring three goals in a row to extend the lead to a margin of five making the result 16–11 in their favour. The Serbians did not give up and managed to cut their opponent's comfortable lead to only one goal with a 4–0 series. One of the driving forces for the comeback was the goalkeeper Katarina Tomašević who saved two penalties in one minute. The final entered with a tied result at 19–19 in the last four minutes. Brazil scored to take the lead, which was answered with an equaliser brought by Andrea Lekić to make it 20–20. The Brazilian team took the lead again and after Dragana Cvijić missed to score for her team, Ana Paula Rodrigues scored to finish the match and set the final result 22–20. Alexandra do Nascimento with six and Cvijić with five goals were the best scorers for the two finalists. Brazil became the first South American country to win the World Women's Handball Championship and only the second non-European (after South Korea) to do so.

Statistics

Final ranking

According to the IHF.

All Star Team

Chosen by team officials and IHF experts: IHF.info

Top goalscorers

Source: IHF.info

Top goalkeepers

Source: IHF.info

References

External links

IHF website

World Handball Championship tournaments
World Women's Handball Championship
World Women's Handball Championship
International handball competitions hosted by Serbia
Women's handball in Serbia
December 2013 sports events in Europe
International sports competitions in Belgrade
2010s in Belgrade
Sports competitions in Novi Sad
21st century in Novi Sad
Sport in Niš
Sport in Zrenjanin